General (Rtd) Tan Sri Md Hashim bin Hussein is a Malaysian retired Army officer, diplomat and politician. He served as Chief of the Malaysian Army from 1 January 1999 to 31 December 2002.

Background 
Md Hashim bin Hussein is born in Johor Bahru on 2 June 1947. He is the second child from nine siblings and early educated in Malay College Kuala Kangsar and Royal Military College.

Military Education & Service 
Md Hashim trained as a cadet in Royal Military Academy Sandhurst on 1963. Warfare knowledge is essential to him, he is also learning military techniques in Malaysia and in foreign countries in order to bring Malaysian Army to a higher standard of the time. Following are lists of his Alma mater:
 Army Intelligence Centre Woodside, Australia – 1971.
 US Army Infantry School, Fort Benning – 1975.
 Malaysian Staff College, Kuala Lumpur – 1979.
 United Kingdom Infantry School, Warminster – 1980.
 US Army Command and General Staff College, Fort Leavenworth – 1985.
 Malaysian Armed Forces Defence College, Kuala Lumpur – 1989

In 1991, Md Hashim Hussein succeeded in acquiring a master's degree in war studies in King's College London with honours.

During his military service, he is being trusted to command the following positions:
 Instructor at the Royal Military College (Malaysia), Sungai Besi, Selangor.
 Brigade Major, 9th Infantry Brigade.
 Commanding Officer, 11th Royal Malay Regiment.
 Directing Staff, Malaysian Armed Forces Staff College.
 First Malaysian Exchange Directing Staff at the Australian Army Command and Staff College.
 Commandant, Army Training Center, Port Dickson, Negeri Sembilan.

In 1993–1994, he is appointed as the Commanding Officer of United Nations Protection Force Malaysian Commander (UNPROFOR) stationed in Bosnia Herzegovina.

He is also the first Commanding Officer to the then newly created 10 Paratrooper Brigade (Malaysia).

In January 1999, he is selected as the 18th Chief of the Malaysian army.

In 2001, he is included in Induction of International Officer "Hall of Fame", United States Command and General Staff College Fort Leavenworth, USA.

After 36 years of service in the military, he retires in December 2002 with the rank of General.

After Retirement from Military 
Upon retiring from military service, General Md Hashim is appointed as Malaysian High Commissioner to Pakistan up to year 2005.

Afterwards, he is appointed as Chairman of National Authority Chemical Weapons stationed in Wisma Putra, Putrajaya till 2008.

Politics 
On 6 March 2013, he announced to join Parti Keadilan Rakyat (PKR) of the Pakatan Rakyat (PR) opposition coalition. In the subsequent 2013 Malaysian general election, he contested in parliamentary constituency of Johor Bahru but lost to United Malays National Organisation (UMNO)'s strongman of Barisan Nasional (BN); Shahrir Abdul Samad.

Election results

Honours 
  : 
 Officer of the Order of the Defender of the Realm (K.M.N.) (1985)
 Commander of the Order of Loyalty to the Crown of Malaysia (P.S.M.) - Tan Sri (2001)
  :
  State of Kedah Distinguished Service Star (B.C.K.)
  :
  Knight Companion of the Order of Sultan Ahmad Shah of Pahang (D.S.A.P.) - Dato' (1995)
  :
  Knight Grand Commander of the Order of Taming Sari (S.P.T.S.) - Dato' Seri Panglima (1999)
 :
 Knight Grand Commander of the Order of the Noble Crown of Kelantan (S.P.K.K.) - Dato’ (1999)
 Malaysian Armed Forces :
 Warrior of the Most Gallant Order of Military Service (P.A.T.)
 Loyal Commander of the Most Gallant Order of Military Service (P.S.A.T.)
 Courageous Commander of the Most Gallant Order of Military Service (P.G.A.T.) (1999)
 :
 Knight Commander of the Order of the Crown of Johor (D.P.M.J.) - Dato’ (1998)
 Knight Grand Commander of the Order of the Crown of Johor (S.P.M.J.) - Dato’ (2000)
 :
 Knight Commander of the Glorious Order of the Crown of Kedah (D.G.M.K.) - Dato’ Wira (2002)

Foreign Honours 
 :
 Recipient of the Nishan-e-Imtiaz
 :
 Recipient of the Order of National Security Merit (Tong-il)
 :
 1st Bosnian Golden Medal (Ljiljan)
 :
 Commander of the Legion of Merit (LOM) (2001)
 :
 Bintang Kartika Paksi Utama
 :
 Officer de I’ Ordre national du Mérite
 :
 Knight Grand Cross (First Class) of the Order of the Crown of Thailand

References 

1947 births
Living people
People from Johor
Malaysian people of Malay descent
Malaysian Muslims
Malaysian military personnel
Malaysian diplomats
High Commissioners of Malaysia to Pakistan
People's Justice Party (Malaysia) politicians
Alumni of King's College London
Officers of the Order of the Defender of the Realm
Commanders of the Order of Loyalty to the Crown of Malaysia
Knights Commander of the Order of the Crown of Johor
Knights Grand Commander of the Order of the Crown of Johor
21st-century Malaysian people